Halacritus is a genus of clown beetles in the family Histeridae. There are more than 20 described species in Halacritus.

Species
These 24 species belong to the genus Halacritus:

 Halacritus algarum (Schmidt, 1893)
 Halacritus alutiger Wenzel, 1944
 Halacritus atlanticus (Chobaut, 1923)
 Halacritus averyi Gomy, 1978
 Halacritus beneteaui Gomy, 1978
 Halacritus blackwelderi Wenzel, 1944
 Halacritus capensis Gomy, 1989
 Halacritus caracciolii Gomy, 1989
 Halacritus cauchei Gomy, 1978
 Halacritus condenti Gomy, 1989
 Halacritus courayei Gomy, 2004
 Halacritus glabrus Wenzel, 1944
 Halacritus instabilis (Marseul, 1869)
 Halacritus kidi Gomy, 1978
 Halacritus labusei Gomy, 1978
 Halacritus lividus (Lea, 1925)
 Halacritus maritimus (J. L. LeConte, 1851)
 Halacritus marthoti Gomy, 1976
 Halacritus missoni Gomy, 1978
 Halacritus parallelus (Casey, 1916)
 Halacritus punctum (Aubé, 1842)
 Halacritus regimondi Gomy, 1978
 Halacritus salinus (J. L. LeConte, 1878)
 Halacritus surcoufi Gomy, 1978

References

Further reading

External links

 

Histeridae
Articles created by Qbugbot